Egypt competed at the 2011 World Aquatics Championships in Shanghai, China between July 16 and 31, 2011.

Open water swimming

Men

Women

Mixed

Swimming

Egypt qualified 3 swimmers.

Men

Women

Synchronised swimming

Egypt has qualified 11 athletes in synchronised swimming.

Women

Reserve
Hana Khaled Ali

References

Nations at the 2011 World Aquatics Championships
2011
World Aquatics Championships